Stanislav "Stacha" Halpern (20 October 1919 – 28 January 1969) was a Polish Australian painter and sculptor. Following the Nazi invasion of Poland in 1939, Halpern emigrated to Australia. A decade later he became a naturalised Australian citizen. Based in Melbourne for much of his early career, Halpern painted bold semi-abstract works of street life. Later he travelled throughout Europe and experimented with pure abstraction and expressionistic portraiture. Australian artist and friend Arthur Boyd described Halpern's work as "original, vigorous and always arresting".

Paintings, sculptures and pottery by Halpern are held in several of Australia's public collections including the National Gallery of Australia, the National Gallery of Victoria and the Art Gallery of South Australia.

References

External links
 Stacha Halpern biography and artworks at the Charles Nodrum Gallery
 Peter Timms, 'Halpern, Stanislaw (Stacha) (1919–1969)', Australian Dictionary of Biography, National Centre of Biography, Australian National University, http://adb.anu.edu.au/biography/halpern-stanislaw-stacha-10400/text18429, published first in hardcopy 1996, retrieved 4 January 2015.

1919 births
1969 deaths
Artists from Melbourne
Australian Jews
Australian people of Polish-Jewish descent
Polish emigrants to Australia
Jewish painters
Jewish sculptors
Modern painters
Naturalised citizens of Australia
Australian potters
20th-century Australian sculptors
20th-century ceramists